Markus Kolke (born 18 August 1990) is a German professional footballer who plays as a goalkeeper for 3. Liga club Hansa Rostock, a team he also captains.

After playing in the lower tiers of German football, Kolke established himself as a starter for Wehen Wiesbaden in 2011. He played at the club for eight years, making 232 appearances and experiencing promotion to the 2. Bundesliga in his final season at the club. In 2019, Kolke moved to 3. Liga club Hansa Rostock, where he became team captain after one season.

Career 
Born in Erlenbach am Main, Bavaria, Kolke played youth football at TSV Großheubach and Viktoria Aschaffenburg. In 2009, he moved to the second team of Eintracht Frankfurt. There, he was mainly a backup. After a year in Frankfurt, he went to fifth-tier Oberliga Baden-Württemberg club Waldhof Mannheim. He immediately became the starting goalkeeper and played all matches for the club during the 2010–11 season, where the club won the championship and promoted to the Regionalliga.

In the summer of 2011, Kolke moved to SV Wehen Wiesbaden. There, he won the starting job over Michael Gurski in October 2013 and featured as the team's regular goalkeeper since. He became notorious for saving penalties while at Wehen, saving six out of seven penalties during the 2016–17 season. Through promotion play-offs, Kolke, who was also team captain at times, was able to help the club reach promotion to the 2. Bundesliga. In his eight-year tenure with Wehen Wiesbaden, he made 232 appearances as the main goalkeeper, 210 of them in league games.

Nevertheless, he joined Hansa Rostock for the 2019–20 3. Liga season, where he signed a two-year contract as the successor to the outgoing goalkeeper Ioannis Gelios. Kolke immediately established himself as the starting goalkeeper under Hansa manager Jens Härtel, making all 38 league appearances for Rostock. He kept a clean sheet and also played in the DFB Pokal against 2. Bundesliga outfit VfB Stuttgart (1–0). Kolke became the new record-holding goalkeeper in 3. Liga appearances in a 1–1 draw at Mannheim with 220 appearances, taking over the top spot from previous record holder Robert Wulnikowski. At the end of the season, Hansa finished sixth in the league table and won the Mecklenburg-Vorpommern Cup. In the final, Torgelower FC Greif was defeated 3–0. Ahead of the 2020–21 season, Kolke was appointed team captain. As in the previous season, the team faced VfB Stuttgart, now a Bundesliga side, in the DFB Pokal, and again lost the matchup (1–0).

Honours

Club 
Wehen Wiesbaden
 3. Liga promotion play-offs: 2018–19

Hansa Rostock
 Mecklenburg-Vorpommern Cup: 2020

References

External links
 

Living people
1990 births
People from Erlenbach am Main
Sportspeople from Lower Franconia
Association football goalkeepers
German footballers
Viktoria Aschaffenburg players
Eintracht Frankfurt II players
SV Waldhof Mannheim players
SV Wehen Wiesbaden players
FC Hansa Rostock players
3. Liga players
Footballers from Bavaria